Harold Newton is an artist.

Harold Newton may also refer to:
Harold Newton (cricketer)
Hal Newton, Harold Newton, Canadian football player

See also
Harry Newton (disambiguation)